People in the San Francisco Bay Area rely on a complex multimodal transportation infrastructure consisting of roads, bridges, highways, rail, tunnels, airports, seaports, and bike and pedestrian paths. The development, maintenance, and operation of these different modes of transportation are overseen by various agencies, including the California Department of Transportation (Caltrans), the Association of Bay Area Governments, San Francisco Municipal Transportation Agency, and the Metropolitan Transportation Commission. These and other organizations collectively manage several interstate highways and state routes, eight passenger rail networks, eight trans-bay bridges, transbay ferry service, local and transbay bus service, three international airports, and an extensive network of roads, tunnels, and bike paths.

The Bay Area, especially San Francisco, are frequently listed as one of the best and most extensive cities and/or metropolitan areas in the United States for public transportation. Local trips on transit are frequently accomplished by bus services. Different agencies serve different corners of the Bay Area, such as samTrans serving mostly San Mateo County and County Connection connecting the suburbs of Contra Costa County; though some bus agencies operate transbay services, such as Golden Gate Transit. While ferries also connect communities across the bay, most transbay and longer-distance trips on public transportation, however, use rail-based transit. Bay Area Rapid Transit (BART) is the sole heavy rail system within the bay and the dominant provider of regional transportation between San Francisco, northern San Mateo County, and much of the East Bay. The Bay Area is also home to various commuter rail services, such as SMART within Sonoma and Marin counties, Caltrain on the San Francisco Peninsula, ACE between San Jose and Stockton, and various Amtrak routes out of Oakland and San Jose. San Francisco is also the home of the world's last manually-operated cable car system, and both San Francisco's SFMTA and Santa Clara's VTA operate light rail networks to complement their bus services. With the sole exception of ACE and Amtrak services, all public transit within the Bay Area can be paid for by using the Clipper card.

Though not as extensive as Southern California's freeways, the Bay Area is also home to an extensive network of highways. Four bridges traverse the San Francisco Bay itself and four more traverse the northern San Pablo Bay, in addition to more localized expressways such as US 101 and Interstate 280 in the Peninsula, Interstates 680 and 880 in the East Bay, and Interstate 505 in the north. Many highways have tolled express lanes, paid for by using FasTrak. Streets within the Bay Area vary from wider stroads such as El Camino Real in the Peninsula, to denser slower streets within urban cores, to scenic routes like California State Route 1. However, San Francisco has historically approached freeways with hostility, and activists have moved to stop the construction of new highways and tear down existing ones, most notably inciting the 1991 demolition of the Embarcadero Freeway. The city today is seen as the birthplace of American highway revolts.

Airports

The Bay Area has four airports served by commercial airlines, three of which are international airports. In addition to these airports, there are many general aviation airports in the region. 
San Francisco International Airport (SFO)
The busiest in the region, and a major international hub airport in California second only to LAX (Los Angeles). Hub for United Airlines and Alaska Airlines.
San Jose International Airport (SJC)
The second-busiest and fastest-growing airport in the Bay Area. It serves as a focus city for Alaska Airlines.
Oakland International Airport (OAK)
The third-busiest airport in the region and a base for Southwest Airlines. Oakland International Airport is the oldest of the Bay Area's civilian airports still in use. The site was chosen due to good weather conditions for aircraft operations.
Charles M. Schulz–Sonoma County Airport (STS)
The smallest of the Bay Area airports served by commercial airlines.

Airport Transportation
All major Bay Area airports are situated next to freeways and are served by public transportation, ride-share services, and various private shuttle bus operators.

Major airport/public transportation connections
San Francisco can be directly accessed through BART at the SFO station at the International Terminal. Using BART, riders can also transfer to Caltrain at the nearby Millbrae station. SFO also has an inter-terminal AirTrain service. 
San Jose can be accessed by VTA Route , which connects to BART, Caltrain, VTA light rail and other bus and rail services at the Santa Clara Transit Center, Metro/Airport station and Milpitas station. The airport also operates an inter-terminal shuttle bus. 
Oakland Airport is connected to BART by the Oakland Airport Connector between the airport and Coliseum station. 
Sonoma County Airport is directly connected to SMART commuter rail at the Sonoma County Airport station.

Public transportation

Public transportation in the San Francisco Bay Area is quite extensive, including one rapid transit system, three commuter rail lines, two light rail systems, two ferry systems, Amtrak inter-city rail services, and four major overlapping bus agencies, in addition to dozens of smaller ones. Most agencies accept the Clipper Card, a reloadable universal electronic payment card.

An extensive rail infrastructure that provides a mix of services exists within the nine Bay Area counties. Bay Area Rapid Transit, commonly known as BART, provides rapid transit service between San Francisco and Contra Costa, Alameda, San Mateo, and Santa Clara counties. Caltrain, which runs on the right-of-way of the historic Southern Pacific Railroad, provides commuter rail service on the San Francisco Peninsula, linking the cities of San Francisco, San Jose, Gilroy, and numerous peninsula cities in between. The Millbrae Intermodal Terminal provides transfers between Caltrain and BART. The Altamont Corridor Express, commonly known as ACE, also provides commuter rail service, but from the Central Valley into Silicon Valley, terminating at San Jose's Diridon Station. To the north, Sonoma–Marin Area Rail Transit (SMART) line provides commuter rail service in Sonoma and Marin counties.

In addition, Amtrak has a presence throughout the Bay Area. There are two intercity services, the Capitol Corridor connects Bay Area cities to Sacramento and the San Joaquins connects to cities across the San Joaquin Valley. Additionally, there are two long-distance services, the Coast Starlight offers service to Seattle and Los Angeles, while California Zephyr runs to Chicago via Denver.

The Bay Area also has two light rail systems: one run by San Francisco Municipal Railway called Muni Metro, which operates within the city of San Francisco, and the other run by the Santa Clara Valley Transportation Authority, which operates within Santa Clara County.

A series of overlapping bus agencies provide additional public transit coverage to Bay Area regions both served and not served by rail transit. The four largest agencies, Muni, AC Transit, SamTrans, and VTA operate within the City of San Francisco, East Bay, the Peninsula, and South Bay respectively, although their service areas generally overlap with neighboring agencies and numerous smaller agencies. All of these agencies also provide limited night bus service, which are intended to "shadow" the rail routes that are closed during the nighttime hours for maintenance. In addition, the four bus agencies are each independently pursuing constructing bus rapid transit systems by developing separated right-of-ways and traffic signaling on busy corridors, including on Geary and Van Ness for Muni, El Camino Real for SamTrans and VTA, and International Boulevard for AC Transit.

Although BART and certain bus agencies provide travel over (or under) the San Francisco bay, Golden Gate Ferry and San Francisco Bay Ferry provide ferry service across the bay.

Most systems allow bicycles onto their systems with no additional charge. In addition, Bay Area residents may rent bicycles from the Bay Wheels bike share in certain parts of San Francisco, San Mateo, and Santa Clara counties.

Rapid transit

Commuter rail

Long-distance and intercity rail

Light rail

Bus services and stations
The Transbay Terminal serves as the terminus for Greyhound long-distance bus services and as a hub for regional bus systems AC Transit (Alameda & Contra Costa counties), WestCAT, SamTrans (San Mateo County), and Golden Gate Transit (Marin and Sonoma Counties).

There are several bus stations in the San Francisco Bay Area including Fairfield Transportation Center, Richmond Parkway Transit Center, Naglee Park and Ride, Hercules Transit Center, Curtola Park & Ride, Eastmont Transit Center, San Rafael Transit Center and many bus bays at BART stations.

Major bus agencies

Minor bus agencies

Several other transit agencies (including San Benito Transit, Stanislaus Regional Transit Authority, San Joaquin RTD, Rio Vista Delta Breeze, Mendocino Transit, and Santa Cruz Metro) operate regional service from outside the Bay Area to transit stations in the Bay Area.

Private bus companies operate an additional 800 buses, often referred to as tech shuttles. If combined, private shuttles would be the 7th largest transportation provider in the Bay Area.

Ferries

There are also private ferries from Emeryville, Berkeley, and Richmond.

Bike and Scooter Sharing

Bay Wheels (launched as Bay Area Bike Share) is a regional public bicycle sharing system that serves the cities of San Francisco, Oakland, Berkeley, Emeryville, and San Jose.

Any rider may take unlimited trips of up to 30 minutes, as measured from the time the bike is withdrawn from a dock to the time it is returned. Bikes can be picked up at any of the stations using a key fob or electronic code, and dropping them off at any station. A replacement fee of $1,200 is charged if a rented bike is lost.

Several companies also operate dockless bicycle sharing systems in the Bay Area such as Jump Bikes, Lime, and Spin. These dockless systems differ from the Ford GoBike system in that bicycles can be parked freely on the street (or at a bicycle rack in the case of Jump) and do not need to be docked at a designation station. Currently, Jump is the only dockless bicycle sharing company that operates in San Francisco while other competing companies operate dockless systems in other Bay Area cities such as South San Francisco, Oakland, and San Jose.

In 2018, several companies started offering dockless scooter-sharing systems in Bay Area cities such as San Francisco and Oakland. These systems offer electric kick scooters for rent, similar to dockless bicycle sharing systems. Some operators, such as Lime, operate both scooter and bicycle sharing systems. These shared scooters were temporarily banned in San Francisco during summer 2018, but  are available under two operators: Skip and Scoot Networks.

Public Transportation Statistics
The average amount of time people spend commuting with public transit in San Francisco, for example to and from work, on a weekday is 77 min. 23% of public transit riders, ride for more than 2 hours every day. The average amount of time people wait at a stop or station for public transit is 13 min, while 17% of riders wait for over 20 minutes on average every day. The average distance people usually ride in a single trip with public transit is 9.1 km, while 20% travel for over 12 km in a single direction.

A 2011 Brookings Institution study ranked the San Francisco MSA and the San Jose MSA sixteenth and second, respectively, on transit coverage to job access. Another nationwide study, conducted by the University of Minnesota in 2014, ranked the San Francisco MSA second and San Jose MSA tenth. In 2012 it was the joint winner of the Sustainable Transport Award. Despite this, the San Francisco Bay Area remains the second most traffic-congested region in the country with a declining per capita use of public transit.

In 2013, the San Francisco-Oakland-Hayward metropolitan statistical area (San Francisco MSA) had the second lowest percentage of workers who commuted by private automobile (69.8 percent), with 7.6 percent of area workers traveling via bus. During the period starting in 2006 and ending in 2013, the San Francisco MSA had the greatest percentage decline of workers commuting by automobile (3.8 percent) among MSAs with more than a half million residents.

Freeways and highways

The Bay Area possesses an extensive freeway and highway system (although it is not as extensive as Southern California).

Trans-bay crossings

The Peninsula to the South Bay

The freeway system in Santa Clara county is augmented by the Santa Clara County expressway system.

North Bay

East Bay

Named interchanges
The Alemany Maze is the interchange between the James Lick Freeway (U.S. Route 101) and Interstate 280.

The MacArthur Maze is the interchange between the Eastshore Freeway, Nimitz Freeway, and MacArthur Freeway at the east end of the Bay Bridge.

The Joe Colla Interchange is the interchange between US 101, I-280, and I-680. Both I-280 and I-680's southern termini is located as this interchange.

San Francisco streets

Due to its unique geography, and the freeway revolts of the late 1950s, San Francisco is one of the few American cities served primarily by arterial roads for most trips within city limits, rather than a freeway network supplemented by arterial roads.

Interstate 80 begins at the approach to the Bay Bridge and is the only direct automobile link to the East Bay. U.S. Route 101 connects to the western terminus of Interstate 80 and provides access to the south of the city along San Francisco Bay toward Silicon Valley. Northward, the routing for U.S. 101 uses arterial streets Mission Street (northbound) and South Van Ness Avenue (southbound), Van Ness Avenue, Lombard Street, Richardson Avenue, and Doyle Drive to connect to the Golden Gate Bridge, the only direct automobile link to Marin County and the North Bay.

State Route 1 also enters San Francisco from the north via the Golden Gate Bridge, but turns south away from the routing of U.S. 101, first onto Park Presidio Blvd through Golden Gate Park, and then bisecting the west side of the city as the 19th Avenue arterial thoroughfare, joining with Interstate 280 at the city's southern border. Interstate 280 continues south from San Francisco. Interstate 280 also turns to the east along the southern edge of the city, terminating just south of the Bay Bridge in the South of Market neighborhood. After the 1989 Loma Prieta earthquake, city leaders decided to demolish the Embarcadero Freeway, and a portion of the Central Freeway, converting them into street-level boulevards.

State Route 35 enters the city from the south as Skyline Boulevard, following city streets until it terminates at its intersection with Highway 1. State Route 82 enters San Francisco from the south as Mission Street, following the path of the historic El Camino Real and terminating shortly thereafter at its junction with 280. Major east–west thoroughfares include Geary Boulevard, the Lincoln Way/Fell Street corridor, and Market Street/Portola Drive.

The Western Terminus of the historic transcontinental Lincoln Highway, the first road across America, is in San Francisco's Lincoln Park.

Highway revolts 

San Francisco is the birthplace of highway revolts in the United States, and highways have historically been approached with hostility by locals across the Bay Area. Protests have occurred against highways as early as 1955, and these protests eventually cancelled the construction of additional highways through Golden Gate Park and the Presidio, and further led to the demolishing of the Embarcadero Freeway in the early 1990s. Protests additionally occurred throughout the East Bay, cancelling projects such as the Ashby Freeway through Berkeley and the Richmond Boulevard Freeway in Oakland.

San Francisco Bay Trail

The San Francisco Bay Trail is a bicycle and pedestrian trail that will eventually allow continuous travel around the shoreline of San Francisco Bay. Sections of the Bay Trail exist in all nine Bay Area counties. The longest continuous segments include  primarily on gravel levees between East Palo Alto and San Jose in Santa Clara County;  in San Mateo County between Millbrae and San Carlos;  in central Alameda County from San Leandro to Hayward; and  along the shoreline and on city streets through Richmond in Contra Costa County. The northernmost trail section passes through San Pablo Bay National Wildlife Refuge.

Bridges

Due to the central location of the San Francisco Bay, eight toll bridges cross the Bay or Bay tributaries. Each of the bridges collect separate tolls, and all of them accept payment through FasTrak, an electronic toll collection system used in the state of California. Seven of these eight bridges are owned directly by the State of California, while the Golden Gate Bridge is owned and operated by the Golden Gate Bridge, Highway and Transportation District.

Seaports

The Port of San Francisco was once the largest and busiest seaport on the West Coast. It featured rows of piers perpendicular to the shore, where cargo from the moored ships was handled by cranes and manual labor and transported to nearby warehouses. The port handled cargo to and from trans-Pacific and Atlantic destinations, and was the West Coast center of the lumber trade. The 1934 West Coast Longshore Strike, an important episode in the history of the American labor movement, brought most ports to a standstill. The advent of container shipping made pier-based ports obsolete, and most commercial berths moved to the Port of Oakland and Port of Richmond. A few active berths specializing in break bulk cargo remain alongside the Islais Creek Channel.

The port currently uses Pier 35 to handle the 60–80 cruise ship calls and 200,000 passengers that come to San Francisco. Itineraries from San Francisco usually include round trip cruises to Alaska and Mexico. The James R. Herman Cruise Terminal Project at Pier 27 opened in 2014 as a replacement. The previous primary terminal at Pier 35 had neither the sufficient capacity to allow for the increasing length and passenger capacity of new cruise ships nor the amenities needed for an international cruise terminal.

On March 16, 2013, Princess Cruises Grand Princess became the first ship to home port in San Francisco year round. The ship offers cruises to Alaska, California Coasts, Hawaii, and Mexico. Grand Princess  will be stationed in San Francisco until April 2014. Princess will also operate other ships during the summer of 2014, making it the only cruise line home porting year round in San Francisco.

See also

List of San Francisco Bay Area trains

References

External links

 Bay Area Shuttles directory
 Interstate-Guide.com
 West Coast AA Roads (San Francisco Bay Areas)
 Live Toll Prices for San Francisco Bay Area Bridges
 Employee Transportation San Francisco Bay Area 

 
 
San Francisco Bay Area-related lists